Tosca Petridis (born Tasis Petridis, 30 October 1966) is an Australian former kickboxer and boxer.
He was born in Melbourne, however is of Greek ethnicity. He lives in Melbourne.

Kickboxing
Tosca is a former 7 time World Kickboxing champion.

In 1992, Tosca won his first World Kickboxing Title, winning the WKA/ISKA World Light Heavyweight Championship against American Mike Cole in Melbourne.

In 1993, Petridis beat the legendary Jean-Yves Thériault, by points decision in a 12-round fight in Montreal, Quebec, Canada, for Thériault's world Kickboxing title, under American Kickboxing rules.  
Tosca in 1993, also competed in the K-2 Grand Prix '93 tournament, which was a Light Heavyweight tournament hosted by K-1.  In this tournament, he beat 1991 World Karate Cup champion Toshiyuki Atokawa in the quarter finals by unanimous points decision, before losing on a very close points decision in the semi-final to Muay Thai legend, Changpuek Kiatsongrit.

In 1995, Tosca fought Dutch legend, Rob Kaman under Muay Thai rules, and after Tosca seemingly being in front on points against Kaman, the fight was stopped towards the end, after an accidental headbutt, which had the fight ruled a no contest.

Boxing

Tosca also fought a few times in boxing, later in his career, where he became the Australian Cruiserweight boxing champion. 
In his second boxing bout, he beat former 3 time world Boxing champion Iran Barkley.
His overall boxing record was 9 wins, 5 losses, and 1 draw.

Mixed martial arts
Tosca also competed in one MMA match in 2004, where he defeated Judo practitioner, Peter Jones by TKO.

Titles
2004 Australia Cruiserweight Title in Perth, Australia
1999 PABA Cruiserweight Title in Melbourne, Australia 
1999 Australia Cruiserweight Title in Melbourne, Australia
1993 P.K.C. Full Contact Super Middleweight World title.

Professional boxing record

Kickboxing record (notable bouts)

Mixed Martial Arts record

References

External links
http://www.dailymotion.com/video/xxtzz_tasis-petridis-vs-toshiyuki-atokawa_sport
http://www.dailymotion.com/video/xxu6g_changpuek-kiasongrit-vs-tasis-petri_sport

1966 births
Australian people of Greek descent
Australian male kickboxers
Greek male boxers
Greek male kickboxers
Light heavyweight kickboxers
Cruiserweight kickboxers
Heavyweight kickboxers
Australian male mixed martial artists
Mixed martial artists utilizing boxing
Mixed martial artists utilizing kickboxing
Living people
Australian male boxers
Sportspeople from Melbourne